Taking Tiger Mountain by Strategy is a Chinese film from 1970, during the height of the Cultural Revolution.  The film was directed by Xie Tieli and was based on a contemporary Beijing opera, one of the eight model plays allowed during the Cultural Revolution. The story is based on the novel Lin hai xue yuan, and tells the story of an incident in 1946, during the Chinese Civil War.

Taking Tiger Mountain by Strategy has been identified as one of the most watched films of all time. Official Chinese government statistics claimed a total audience of 7.3 billion through the end of 1974, meaning every citizen of China had seen the film at least seven times. The large audience can be attributed to the fact that few films were produced during the Cultural Revolution, and almost all earlier films were banned; nevertheless, the average village held ten film showings per year, and failure to attend could have been seen as a sign of political deviation. Hence, Chinese citizens would have been expected to see the film multiple times during the Cultural Revolution era.

References

External links

1970 films
Chinese war drama films
1970s Mandarin-language films
1970s musical films
Chinese propaganda films
Maoist China propaganda films
Chinese musical drama films